The canton of Emblavez-et-Meygal is an administrative division of the Haute-Loire department, south-central France. It was created at the French canton reorganisation which came into effect in March 2015. Its seat is in Saint-Julien-Chapteuil.

It consists of the following communes:
 
Beaulieu
Chamalières-sur-Loire
Lavoûte-sur-Loire
Malrevers
Mézères
Le Pertuis
Queyrières
Rosières
Saint-Étienne-Lardeyrol
Saint-Hostien
Saint-Julien-Chapteuil
Saint-Pierre-Eynac
Saint-Vincent
Vorey

References

Cantons of Haute-Loire